The Mauritania women's national football team is the representative women's association football team of Mauritania. Its governing body is the Football Federation of the Islamic Republic of Mauritania (FFM) and it competes as a member of the Confederation of African Football (CAF).

Results

2019

2020

2021

2023

References

W
African women's national association football teams
Women's national association football team results